Ricardo Barros may refer to:

 Ricardo Barros (footballer) (born 1990), Portuguese footballer
 Ricardo Barros (politician) (born 1959), Brazilian politician, civil engineer and businessman